The yellow jack (Carangoides bartholomaei), also known as coolihoo, is a species of marine fish in the jack family, Carangidae. It is one of only two representatives of its genus present in the Atlantic Ocean, inhabiting waters off the east coast of the Americas from Massachusetts in the north to Brazil in the south, as well as a number of offshore islands. The yellow jack can be distinguished from closely related species by the length of the jaw, as well as counts of the rays in the fins. Yellow jack inhabit reefs, moving either individually or in schools and are predatory fish which primarily take other small fish. Yellow jack are of minor economic importance, taken by both hook and net methods, and are considered to be fair table fish. They are often caught by boat anglers, although are overlooked for their larger relatives.

Taxonomy and naming
The yellow jack is classified within the genus Carangoides, a group of fish commonly called jacks and trevallies. Carangoides falls into the jack and horse mackerel family Carangidae, the Carangidae are part of the order Carangiformes.

The species was first scientifically described by the famed French taxonomist Georges Cuvier in 1833, based on the holotype specimen collected from St. Bartholomew Island in the West Indies.
Cuvier named this new species Caranx bartholomaei after the island from which the holotype was taken. The genus in which the taxon should be placed has proved contentious, and continues to be today with a number of recent publications placing the species in Carangoides, while others still classify it within Caranx. This article follows the Fishbase and ITIS classification of Carangoides bartholomaei. The species predominant common name, "yellow jack", comes from the colour the species turns as it gets older, with other common names including "coolihoo" and incorrectly, "green jack".

Some authorities place the yellow jack in the genus Caranx.

Description

The yellow jack shows the typical body profile of the genus Carangoides, having a moderately deep, compressed elongate shape, with the dorsal profile slightly more convex than the ventral profile. The dorsal profile of the head is slightly curved from the snout to the nape, with the eye having a moderately well developed adipose eyelid. One of the major diagnostic features is that the upper jaw does not reach to the interior margin of the eye. Both jaws contain narrow bands of villiform teeth, with these bands becoming wider anteriorly. The dorsal fin is in two parts, the first containing 7 spines and the second of 1 spine followed by 25 to 28 soft rays. The anal fin is similar to the second dorsal fin, consisting of two anteriorly detached spines followed by 1 spine and 21 to 24 soft rays. The lobes of the dorsal and anal fins are slightly pronounced, and the pectoral fin is falcate, being longer than the head. The lateral line has a slight, extended anterior curve, with this curved section being longer than the posterior straight section. The straight section of the lateral line has 22 to 28 scutes, with rest of the body being covered in smooth cycloid scales, and the chest being completely scaled. The caudal peduncle has bilateral paired keels present. There are 24 vertebrae and a total of 24 to 30 gill rakers.

The yellow jack is a pale yellow-green-blue dorsally, becoming silver on the underside. Juveniles show around 5 vertical bands, which fade to blotches and finally disappear altogether as the fish matures. The fins are all hyaline in appearance, often with a golden-brown tinge to them. Older fish tend to be more yellow, with large specimens having bright yellow fins.

Distribution and habitat
The yellow jack is distributed throughout the tropical to subtropical western Atlantic Ocean, ranging on the coast of America from Massachusetts to Maceio, Brazil. The species range includes hundreds of offshore islands in the eastern Atlantic, including Bermuda, the Bahamas, the West Indies and throughout the Caribbean Sea. Along with the bar jack, Carangoides ruber, it is only one of two species of Carangoides present in the Atlantic, with all others having Indo-Pacific distributions.
it also can be found in the Libyan coast ( at the Mediterranean sea ).
The yellow jack is occasionally found in inshore coastal waters, but prefers offshore reefs and islands, or open marine waters over the continental shelf. Whilst not often seen in shallow waters near the American continent, yellow jack are commonly seen in the sandy shallows of a number of Caribbean islands foraging with other species.

Biology
Yellow jack are predatory fish, moving both individually or in small groups, with their main prey being small fish, although observational records also show smaller benthic prey is taken. Yellow jack have been observed in a 'following role', moving around with larger species to take advantage of the commotion caused by the bigger fish, allowing the jack to opportunistically forage or take scraps left by the larger fish. As well as other teleosts, yellow jack have also been recorded following eels, stingrays and nurse sharks. In one case, they were observed following a flying gurnard, itself smaller than the jack, that disturbed the substrate, causing various organisms to be displaced and become available for predation. As well as being 'followers', larger specimens have also been observed as the 'followed' species. The species has also been observed living in close relationships with spinner dolphins, feeding off the dolphin's waste products. This behavior has also been observed in a number of other jacks living in the region.

Spawning takes place in offshore waters between February and October. Observational studies in Belize have shown that although courtship occurs in pairs, the species is a group spawner, congregating in large balls of around 300 fish, with spawning occurring mostly before sunset. Juveniles live near the surface of the ocean, often hiding amongst large mats of jellyfish or Sargassum weed, with a coloration that camouflages the fish in the weed. These young fish are often moved long distances by the Gulf Stream, and this is probably the process responsible for fish found as far north as Massachusetts.

Relationship to humans
Yellow jack are a minor commercial species throughout their range, taken by seines, trawls and hook and line techniques. They are also caught by recreational fishermen, with fish baits and lures and often while trolling, although they are rarely targeted specifically. The species is rated as a fair to good table fish, and is marketed both fresh and salted. Yellow jack are known to be carriers of ciguatera around the West Indies, and are classified as a high risk species, with their predatory nature allowing the toxin to accumulate in their flesh. The yellow jack was actually the first species outside of the Pacific Ocean to be confirmed as carrying ciguatera toxins, although these early studies showed that the toxin was biochemically slightly different from the Pacific strain.

References

External links
 Yellow jack at Fishbase
 Pictures and information about yellow jack
 Information about jacks and mackerels
 

yellow jack
Fish of the Eastern United States
Fish of the Western Atlantic
yellow jack
yellow jack
Taxobox binomials not recognized by IUCN